BPA may refer to:

Organizations 
BPA Worldwide, an organization that audits circulation figures for mass media
Banca Privada d'Andorra
Bangladesh Police Academy
Blue Panorama Airlines, ICAO code
Bonneville Power Administration, a U.S. power authority
Boardgame Players Association
Bradford Park Avenue A.F.C., an association football club
British Parking Association
British Parachute Association
British Paediatric Association
British Philosophical Association 
British Pipeline Agency, a joint venture between BP Oil UK and Shell UK
British Pyrotechnists Association
Bureau of Pensions Advocates, a semi-independent unit of Veterans Affairs Canada that provides legal support to Vets and RCMP
Busan Port Authority
Bush Pilot Airways (a.k.a. Air Queensland), a former Australian airline
Business and Professionals Alliance for Hong Kong, a pro-establishment political party in Hong Kong
Business Professionals of America, a career and technical student organization that is headquartered in Columbus, Ohio
Metropolitan Black Police Association, a body representing Black and Asian members of the Metropolitan Police in London, United Kingdom

Science and technology 
Bisphenol A, a carbon-based synthetic compound used in the manufacture of certain plastics
Bloodstain pattern analysis, a technique in forensic science
Beta-Nitropropionic acid, a mycotoxin
Branch prediction analysis, in cryptography
Business process automation
Boronophenylalanine, a chemical used in neutron capture therapy of cancer

Other uses 
Brighton Port Authority, an alias for musician Norman Cook (born 1963), better known as Fatboy Slim
Oracle BPA Suite, Business Process Analysis software

See also 
 PBA (disambiguation)